The 1903 Colgate football team was an American football team that represented Colgate University as an independent during the 1903 college football season. In its first and only season under head coach Bob Hatch, the team compiled a 4–2–1 record. Carl Smith was the team captain. The team played its home games on Whitnall Field in Hamilton, New York.

Schedule

References

Colgate
Colgate Raiders football seasons
Colgate football